Udo Samel (born 25 June 1953) is a German actor. He has appeared in more than 80 films and television shows since 1977. He starred in the 1994 film Back to Square One, which was entered into the 44th Berlin International Film Festival.

Selected filmography
 Knife in the Head (1978)
  (1983)
 The Death of the White Stallion (1985)
 Mit meinen heißen Tränen (1986, TV film)
  (1988)
 The Seventh Continent (1989)
  (1991, TV film)
  (1993)
 71 Fragments of a Chronology of Chance (1994)
 Back to Square One (1994)
 Killer Condom (1996)
  (1997, TV film)
 The Piano Teacher (2001) - Dr. George Blonskij
 Alles auf Zucker! (2004)
 The Call of the Toad (2005)
  (2014, TV film)
 Goodbye Berlin (2016)
 Artur Schnabel: No Place of Exile (2017)
 The Awakening of Motti Wolkenbruch (2018)
 Babylon Berlin (2018, TV series)
 The Story of My Wife (2021)

Awards
 1977: Förderpreis für Literatur der Landeshauptstadt Düsseldorf in Northrhine-Westphalia
 1987: German Acters Award (Chaplin Shoe)
 1987: 23.Adolf Grimme Preis (with Gold)
 1988: European Film Award - Barcelona (best main acter)
 1994: Bayerischer Fernsehpreis (TV Award) for "Max Salomon" in "Durchreise"

References

External links

1953 births
Living people
People from Trier
German male film actors
German male television actors
20th-century German male actors
21st-century German male actors
German gay actors